Koji Nakano may refer to:

, Japanese composer
, Japanese water polo player
, Japanese writer, translator and literary critic